The 1989 ICF Canoe Sprint World Championships were held in Plovdiv, Bulgaria.

The men's competition consisted of eight Canadian (single paddle, open boat) and nine kayak events. Five events were held for the women, all in kayak. Men's C-4 500 m and C-4 1000 m were added along with women's K-1 5000 m and K-2 5000 m.

This was the 22nd championships in canoe sprint.

Medal summary

Men's

Canoe

Kayak

Women's

Kayak

Medals table

References
ICF medalists for Olympic and World Championships - Part 1: flatwater (now sprint): 1936-2007.
ICF medalists for Olympic and World Championships - Part 2: rest of flatwater (now sprint) and remaining canoeing disciplines: 1936-2007.

Icf Canoe Sprint World Championships, 1989
Icf Canoe Sprint World Championships, 1989
ICF Canoe Sprint World Championships
C
Canoeing in Bulgaria